On November 8, 2022, the District of Columbia held an election for its non-voting House delegate representing the District of Columbia's at-large congressional district. The elections coincided with other elections to the House of Representatives, elections to the United States Senate and various state and local elections.

The incumbent is Democrat Eleanor Holmes Norton, who was re-elected with 86.83%	of the vote in 2020.

Democratic primary

Candidates

Nominee
Eleanor Holmes Norton, incumbent delegate

Eliminated in primary
 Wendy Hamilton, ordained minister and Director of Spiritual and Cultural Outreach for the Andrew Yang 2020 presidential campaign
 Kelly Mikel Williams, journalist

Did not file
 Greg Maye, businessman

Declined
 Karl Racine, Attorney General for the District of Columbia (2015-present)

Endorsements

Results

Republican primary

Candidate

Nominee
Nelson Rimensnyder, nominee for U.S. Delegate in 2018

Results

Libertarian primary
Bruce Majors signaled his intention to run for Delegate, but did not appear on the primary ballot. He won the nomination through write-in votes during from the Libertarian primary.

Candidates

Declared
Bruce Majors, nominee for U.S. Delegate in 2018 and candidate for mayor in 2014

Results

Statehood Green primary

Candidate
The D.C. Statehood Green candidate, Natale Stracuzzi, did not appear on the primary ballot, but won nomination through write-ins in the primary.

Nominee
Natale Stracuzzi, nominee for U.S. Delegate in 2014 and 2016

Results

General election

Results

See also
 United States House of Representatives elections in the District of Columbia

References

External links
Official campaign websites
 Holmes Norton (D) for Delegate
 Rimensnyder (R) for Delegate

2022
District of Columbia
United States House of Representatives